Soe Lwin is the incumbent Regional Auditor of Sagaing,  Myanmar (Burma). He is a member of Sagaing Region Government.

He serving as a Regional Auditor of Sagaing Region.

References

Living people
Year of birth missing (living people)